The Woody Guthrie is a 47' gaff sloop which supports the mission of the larger Sloop Clearwater educating people about the Hudson River and its environment. The vessel was ordered by Pete Seeger in 1978 for the Beacon Sloop Club, which has supplied volunteers to maintain and operate it ever since.

The boat is named after the prominent progressive folk singer Woody Guthrie, a friend of Seeger's and author of the famed tune, "This Land is Your Land".

Since the Guthrie was built, volunteers have given sailing experience to thousands of members and guests of the Beacon Sloop club for free. Guests are educated by the volunteers about the history of the river and the boat and asked to help the mission of the boat in any way they can.

In August 2017, the Woody was relaunched after 6 years of fundraising, 2 years of work, $400k spent, and 5,000 volunteer hours. She was restored at the Hudson River Maritime Museum in Kingston, New York.

References
The Beacon Sloop Club website page on the Woody Guthrie

External links 
Clearwater
Beacon Sloop Club website
Sloop Woody Guthrie Facebook page
Sloop Woody Guthrie website

Environmental organizations based in New York (state)
Hudson River
Individual sailing vessels
Replica ships
Beacon, New York
1978 ships
Cultural depictions of Woody Guthrie